Out of Darkness is a 1994 television film starring Diana Ross.

Out of Darkness may also refer to:

 Out of Darkness, writing by John Haynes Holmes, 1942
 Out of Darkness (album), a 2009 album by In the Midst of Lions
 Out of Darkness, a 2011 album by Pharaoh Overlord
 Out of Darkness (novel), a 2015 novel by Ashley Hope Pérez
 Out of Darkness, a 2013 opera by Jake Heggie